The 1946–47 Scottish Division C was won by Stirling Albion who, along with third placed Leith Athletic, were promoted to Division B. Edinburgh City finished bottom. It was the first season after World War II. It was the first season of the reformed third-tier since 1925–26 and featured three reserve teams.

Table

References

Scottish Division Three seasons
3
Scot